Bore (Parmigiano:  or ;; locally ) is a comune in the province of Parma, Emilia-Romagna, central Italy.

Cities and towns in Emilia-Romagna